Pablo Alberto Cerioni, known as Alberto Cerioni, Paolo Cerioni or Alberto Paolo Cerioni (October 1, 19191948) was an Argentine professional football player.

Career
Cerioni began playing football with Gimnasia y Esgrima de La Plata, making his debut in a league match against San Lorenzo on 23 October 1938. He appeared in 87 league matches and scored 35 goals for Gimnasia during his career.

His brothers Enrique Cerioni and Héctor Cerioni also played football professionally.

References

External links
 Profile at Enciclopediadelcalcio.it

1919 births
1948 deaths
Argentine footballers
Argentine people of Italian descent
Club de Gimnasia y Esgrima La Plata footballers
Argentine expatriate footballers
Expatriate footballers in Italy
Serie A players
Inter Milan players
Expatriate footballers in Uruguay
Club Nacional de Football players
Argentine expatriate sportspeople in Italy
Association football midfielders
Footballers from La Plata